Ted Wang  is an investment partner at Cowboy Ventures, a seed stage venture fund based in the Bay Area with approximately US$200 million in assets under management. Cowboy's focus is backing founders building products that “reimagine work and personal life in large and growing markets” which they refer to as Life 2.0.

Wang invests in both enterprise software and consumer facing technology companies.  At Cowboy, Ted has led investments in companies such as Vic.ai, Lumatax, Fullcast.io, and Aura Health. He has described one of his investment focuses as Unsexy Tech.  He also looks to invest in consumer applications that promote wellness. At Cowboy, he is best known for assisting companies in understanding the metrics needed to get to a Series A financing and helping companies hit those milestones.

Prior to joining Cowboy, Wang was one of the country's leading startup lawyers. For over a decade, he was a partner at technology law firm Fenwick & West and was identified by Bloomberg as "one of Fenwick's biggest draws," in the 2011 article, "Why Techies Like to Friend Fenwick & West." Wang was outside counsel to an array of the most successful venture-backed technology companies including Facebook, Twitter, Dropbox, Square, Sonos, Spotify, Jet, Zuora, Apprio, Samsara, Gusto, Honor, Satellogic, Stripe and Wealthfront.

As a lawyer, Wang was also an innovator in applying technology to the practice of law. He authored numerous open source projects, most notably the Series Seed Documents, which he published with the help of Marc Andreessen. In 2013, he curated a new version of the Series Seed Documents on GitHub.

Wang has a bachelor's degree from Duke University, where he graduated magna cum laude and received his law degree at the University of Virginia School of Law.

References 

Living people
California lawyers
Year of birth missing (living people)